Feliciano Reyna (born 2 December 1955), is the founder of Acción Solidaria. He is known for his work fighting AIDS in Venezuela.

Following the death of his partner from AIDS in 1994, Reyna began battling the AIDS epidemic. He started a pilot AIDS community center in Caracas, which led to a network of centers in Venezuela. These centers offer AIDS education, prevention, and care. Acción Solidaria has trained over 300 educators.

In 2006, Reyna was a finalist for the Red Ribbon Award at the International AIDS Conference in Toronto.

Reyna's approach emphasizes the importance of education in AIDS care and prevention.

In 2002, Reyna was elected an Ashoka Fellow.

References

External links
 Podcast Interview with Feliciano Reyna Social Innovation Conversations, May 9, 2008
Reyna en el más allá (Profile of Feliciano Reyna) - Hableconmigo.com
http://abc.go.com/shows/nightline/episode-guide/2017-02/14-021417-Venezuela-Descent-Into-Chaos

Living people
Venezuelan businesspeople
Ashoka Venezuela Fellows
Venezuelan LGBT people
Venezuelan LGBT rights activists
HIV/AIDS activists
1955 births